The World War II 50th Anniversary commemorative coins are a series of commemorative coins which were issued by the United States Mint in 1993.

Legislation
The World War II 50th Anniversary Commemorative Coins Act authorized the production of three coins, a clad half dollar, a silver dollar, and a gold half eagle. Congress authorized the coins to commemorate the 50th anniversary of the United States’ involvement in World War II. The act allowed the coins to be struck in both proof and uncirculated finishes. Released on May 28, 1993, the coins feature the dual date “1991-1995”, which represents the 50th anniversary of American involvement in the war from 1941 to 1945.

Designs

Half Dollar

The obverse of the World War II 50th Anniversary commemorative half dollar, designed by George Klauba, features the faces of three U.S. service personnel superimposed upon the "V" for victory symbol at center, beneath a B-17 bomber with five stars above the bomber at the top. The reverse of the coin, designed by Bill J. Leftwich, features an American serviceman on the beach of a Pacific island while a landing craft, a ship, and a fighter plane appear in the background.

Dollar

The obverse of the World War II 50th Anniversary commemorative dollar, designed by Thomas D. Rogers, features an American soldier advancing on the beach at Normandy and other servicemen in the trenches. The reverse of the coin, also designed by Rogers, features the shoulder sleeve insignia of Supreme Headquarters Allied Expeditionary Force (SHAEF) and a quote from General Eisenhower's D-Day message to the troops.

Half eagle

The obverse of the World War II 50th Anniversary half eagle, designed by Charles J. Madsen, features an American serviceman with his rifle and arm raised celebrating victory. The reverse of the coin, designed by Edward Southworth Fisher, features "V" for victory at the center of the coin, with the Morse code cryptic for the letter "V" superimposed along laurel leaves.

Specifications
Half Dollar
 Display Box Color: Dark Blue 
 Edge: Reeded
 Weight: 11.340 grams
 Diameter: 30.61 millimeters; 1.205 inches
 Composition: 92% copper; 8% nickel (Cupronickel)

Dollar
 Display Box Color: Dark Blue
 Edge: Reeded
 Weight: 26.730 grams; 0.8594 troy ounce
 Diameter: 38.10 millimeters; 1.50 inches
 Composition: 90% Silver, 10% Copper

Half Eagle
 Display Box Color: Dark Blue
 Edge: Reeded
 Weight: 8.359 grams; 0.2687 troy ounce
 Diameter: 21.59 millimeters; 0.850 inch
 Composition: 90% Gold, 3.6% Silver, 6.4% Copper

See also

 United States commemorative coins
 List of United States commemorative coins and medals (1990s)

References

Commemorative coins of the United States
1993 in the United States